The Fairchild J44  was a small turbojet developed in the 1940s by the Fairchild Engine Division.

Design and development

The Fairchild Engine Division (previously the Ranger Aircraft Engine Division of the Fairchild Engine & Aircraft Corporation) began development of the J44 in 1947. It was used in target drones, missiles, and as jet boosters on several aircraft types.

Applications
 Ryan AQM-34 Firebee (B/C)
 Fairchild AQM-41 Petrel
 Bell Model 65
 Fairchild C-123 Provider
 Fairchild C-82 Packet

Variants
Data from: Aircraft engines of the World 1953, Flight 20 March 1959 :AERO ENGINES 1959 . . ., Aircraft engines of the World 1957
XJ44 Prototypes of the J44
J44-R-1United States Air Force (USAF) engine, similar to the United States Navy (USN) -6, .
J44-R-2Same as -6 but with different installation.
J44-R-3 Longer life - Fairchild C-123 Provider wing-tip boosters.
J44-R-6 USN version, .
J44-R-12 expendable.
J44-R-20BRyan Firebee.
J44-R-24Fairchild Petrel.
J44-R-26  company sponsored variant.
FT-101ECommercial version of -3.
FT-101-GCommercial version with return oil system.

Specifications(J44-R-3)

See also

References

Further reading

 </ref>

1940s turbojet engines
Centrifugal-flow turbojet engines